Banoffee pie is a British dessert pie made from bananas, whipped cream and a thick caramel sauce (made from boiled condensed milk, or dulce de leche), combined either on a buttery biscuit base or one made from crumbled biscuits and butter. Some versions of the recipe also include chocolate, coffee or both.

Its name, sometimes spelled "banoffi", is a portmanteau combining the words "banana" and "toffee".

History
Credit for the pie's invention is claimed by Nigel Mackenzie and Ian Dowding, the owner and chef, respectively, of The Hungry Monk Restaurant in Jevington, East Sussex, England (now closed). They claim to have based the dessert, in 1971, on a San Francisco recipe, that they could not consistently copy, for "Blum's Coffee Toffee Pie", using dulce de leche, a soft toffee made by boiling an unopened can of condensed milk for several hours. After trying various changes including the addition of apple or mandarin orange, Mackenzie suggested banana and Dowding later said that "straight away we knew we had got it right". Mackenzie suggested the name "Banoffi Pie", and the dish proved so popular with their customers that they "couldn't take it off" the menu.

The recipe was published in The Deeper Secrets of the Hungry Monk in 1974, and reprinted in the 1997 cookbook In Heaven with The Hungry Monk. Dowding has stated that his "pet hates are biscuit crumb bases and that horrible cream in aerosols". It was Margaret Thatcher's favourite food to cook.

Similar recipes were adopted by other restaurants throughout the world. In 1984, a number of supermarkets began selling it as an American pie, leading Nigel Mackenzie to offer a £10,000 prize to anyone who could disprove their claim to be the English inventors.

The word "banoffee" entered the English language, used to describe any food or product that tastes or smells of both banana and toffee. A recipe for the pie, using a biscuit crumb base, is often printed on tins of Nestlé's condensed milk, although that recipe calls for the contents of the tin to be boiled with additional butter and sugar instead of boiling the unopened tin – presumably for safety reasons, as tins of Nestlé Carnation Condensed Milk bear the following warning: "CAUTION - Do not boil unopened can as bursting may occur."

See also

 Banana cake
 English cuisine
 List of banana dishes
 List of pies, tarts and flans

References

External links

British pies
British desserts
English cuisine
Sweet pies
Banana dishes
Food and drink introduced in 1971